Lyder Sagen (13 March 1777 – 16 June 1850) was a Norwegian educator and author.

References

1777 births
1850 deaths
People educated at the Bergen Cathedral School
Norwegian educators
Norwegian writers